Rift is a 2019 Nigerian movie directed by Biodun Stephen and produced by Elizabeth Uhuegbu.

Plot
The movie tells a story of how a couple were living happily together until the man started to distance himself from the woman. The wife felt her husband was cheating on her so she decided to get closer to him but to no avail. Another man came into the picture of the woman, leading to many challenges.

Cast
 Enado Odigie
 Kenneth Okolie
 Emem Ufot
 Eloho Festus
 Ray Emodi
 Biodun Stephen

References

2019 films
Nigerian drama films